The Kingston Police is the municipal police force for the city of Kingston, Ontario. It was established by the Common Council of Kingston on December 20, 1841, to control the lawlessness happening in the Province of Canada's capital of 8,500 inhabitants.

Divisions

The Kingston Police currently has four separate divisions each responsible for a separate area of policing.

Investigative Services Division
 Criminal Investigations Unit
Forensic Identification Unit
Internet Child Exploitation Unit
Sexual Assault and Child Abuse

Patrol Division
The most recognized division is the Patrol Division. Responsible for the majority of the visible presence in the local community. The Patrol division is made up of:
 Uniformed Patrol: made up of regular uniformed Police Constables who respond to emergency calls, conduct proactive patrols and crime prevention and enforce of federal and provincial laws, and municipal by-laws investigate complaints, and criminal offences and conduct traffic control and enforcement.
 Emergency Response Unit
 Canine Unit

Operational Support Division 
The Operational Support Division is made up of:

 Community Oriented Response and Engagement
 Bicycle and Mounted Units
 Community Operations
 School Resource Officers
 Traffic Safety Unit
 Collision Reconstruction Unit
 Youth Officer

Administrative Support Division
Current divisions of the Kingston Police include the emergency response unit, drug enforcement unit, patrol division, community response unit, traffic safety, criminal investigations division and the CORE (community oriented response and enforcement) unit.

Former chiefs

Ranks and insignia 
The rank insignia of the Kingston Police Force is similar to that used by some police services elsewhere in Canada and in the United Kingdom, except that the usual "pips" are replaced by maple leaves. The St. Edward's Crown is found on insignia of staff sergeant, all superintendent ranks and all commanding officer ranks.

References 

1841 establishments in Canada
Kingston, Ontario
Law enforcement agencies of Ontario
Municipal law enforcement agencies